Kahler is a village in the commune of Garnich, in south-western Luxembourg.  , the village has a population of 188.

Garnich
Villages in Luxembourg